Giraffe Manor is a small hotel in the Lang'ata suburb of Nairobi, Kenya which, together with its associated Giraffe Centre, serves as a home to a number of endangered Rothschild's giraffes, and operates a breeding programme to reintroduce breeding pairs back into the wild to secure the future of the subspecies.

History
In the 1960s, the Manor was purchased by a local investor who leased it to a succession of people, including the late Dennis Lakin, before it fell into disrepair, unoccupied.

Life as a giraffe sanctuary

Shortly after purchasing the Manor, the Leslie-Melvilles learned that the only remaining Rothschild giraffes in Kenya were in danger due to the purchase by the Kenyan government of an  privately owned ranch (to resettle squatters, some of them speculated to be descendants of victims of land expulsion by the British colonial government) at Soy, near Eldoret, which was the Rothschilds' sole habitat in Kenya. Inevitably, the government's purchase would result in the land being sub-divided into small holdings.

In 1977, the Kenyan government, through the department of wildlife, relocated some of the Rothschilds to lake Nakuru national park which has proven to be a suitable habitat for the endangered sub species.

Daisy was soon joined by another baby giraffe, Marlon (named after Marlon Brando), and since then the Manor, in conjunction with locations such as Woburn Safari Park in Bedfordshire, England, has run a breeding programme to reintroduce the Rothschild giraffe into the wild to expand the gene pool. Part of the land of the Manor is given over to the Giraffe Centre, run by the African Fund for Endangered Wildlife, a charitable organisation set up by the Leslie Melvilles and Betty's daughter in 1972. By tradition, the giraffe themselves are named after individuals who have contributed significantly (whether financially or otherwise) to the work of AFEW, such as Lynn, named for author and journalist Lynn Sherr, a giraffe devotee who wrote an entire book devoted to the creature.

Life as a hotel
In 1983, Rick Anderson (Betty's son) and his wife moved onto the "Giraffe Manor Hotel" property to take over management of Giraffe Manor as a small, private hotel where guests could feed the giraffe from their breakfast table, through the front door, and out of their 2nd story bedroom window. The Manor has twelve bedrooms, one of which is furnished with the belongings of famous writer Karen Blixen (aka Isak Dinesen).

Over the years, the Manor has welcomed guests such as Ellen DeGeneres, Portia de Rossi, Ellie Goulding, Naomi Watts, Eddie Vedder and Walter Cronkite (after whom one of the Manor's resident warthogs was named), Johnny Carson, Brooke Shields and Richard Chamberlain, as well as hosting Richard Branson, Ewan McGregor and Charley Boorman on the launch of Virgin Atlantic's London–Nairobi service in 2007.

In March 2009, Giraffe Manor was purchased by Mikey and Tanya Carr-Hartley. It's part of The Safari Collection group of lodges and hotels, and includes the Sasaab lodge in Samburu County which pays a rent of $58 per guest per night to the local Samburu people who owns the land. The manor and Sasaab were portrayed in the BBC television documentary series Amazing Hotels: Life Beyond the Lobby.

Notes

References

External links

1930s establishments in Kenya
Buildings and structures completed in 1932
Buildings and structures in Nairobi
Hotels in Kenya
Hotels established in 1983
Hotel buildings completed in 1932